The men's heavyweight boxing competition at the 2012 Olympic Games in London was held from 1 to 11 August at the ExCeL Exhibition Centre.

Fifteen boxers from 15 nations are competed.

Competition format
The competition consisted of a single-elimination tournament. Bronze medals were awarded to both semi-final losers. Bouts were three rounds of three minutes each.

Schedule 
All times are British Summer Time (UTC+1)

Results

References

Boxing at the 2012 Summer Olympics
Men's events at the 2012 Summer Olympics